The William A. Stickel Memorial Bridge is a vertical-lift bridge in New Jersey that crosses the Passaic River, connecting Newark and East Newark as part of Interstate 280. The bridge is named in honor of William A. Stickel, a civil engineer from Newark who served as the Essex County engineer for over 20 years.

The bridge was constructed from 1948 to 1949 as Route 25A and is owned and operated by the New Jersey Department of Transportation. The bridge was inaugurated on May 1, 1949, and became part of the interstate system in 1971.

The bridge is one of the few movable bridges that remain in the Interstate Highway System. The bridge remained manned by a drawtender until March 3, 1999. It rarely opens and requires 24-hour notice to NJDOT for opening. The six-lane Stickel Bridge has four through-traffic lanes and two lanes for traffic entering and exiting Route 21 at Exit 15 just west of the bridge.

Rehabilitation
The April 2001 release of a New Jersey Department of Transportation report labeling the Stickel Bridge "structurally deficient and functionally obsolete" has prompted officials to consider options to either rehabilitate or replace the bridge. Inspectors found both the superstructure and substructure of the old span to be in "poor" condition, the result of wall cracks and severe corrosion of structural steel. Furthermore, the steel-grated roadway, narrow lanes and tight ramps leading to the local streets have contributed to the bridge's high accident rate.

In May 2008, the rehabilitation work on the span was completed. Work included having its mechanical systems overhauled, and removal of its old black coating, in favor of a light blue paint.

See also
 
 
 
 List of crossings of the Lower Passaic River

References

External links

NYC Roads page for Interstate 280

Bridges over the Passaic River
Bridges completed in 1949
Bridges in Hudson County, New Jersey
Stickel
Movable bridges on the Interstate Highway System
Transportation in Newark, New Jersey
Vertical lift bridges in New Jersey
East Newark, New Jersey
Interstate 80
Road bridges in New Jersey
Steel bridges in the United States